Steve Eresi Laore (1963/1964 – 26 August 2010) was a Solomon Islands politician and member of parliament. Formerly a mechanic and businessman, and owner of a construction company, he defeated Augustine Taneko to become MP for the Shortlands constituency. He was a member of the Pacific Casino Hotel group that elevated Danny Philip to the position of prime minister.

On 26 August 2010, only 22 days after he took office, he collapsed at a dinner celebrating Philip's victory and was pronounced dead at the hospital. Laore's death left Philip with a majority of one in the Parliament. He was 46 at the time of his death. He was survived by his wife, Caroline Vave Laore, and three children.

References

1960s births
2010 deaths
Solomon Islands businesspeople
Members of the National Parliament of the Solomon Islands
Date of birth missing
Place of birth missing
Place of death missing